Pterotosoma castanea is a species of moth of the  family Uraniidae. It is found in the north-eastern Himalaya, Taiwan and Borneo.

The forewing margin is irregular in shape, strongly concave over the anterior part, and the hindwing has the fringes expanded to give a third tail.

Subspecies
Pterotosoma castanea castanea (north-eastern Himalaya, Taiwan)
Pterotosoma castanea kinabalua (Holloway, 1976) (Borneo)

References

Moths described in 1898
Uraniidae